The Central District of Dashtestan County is in Bushehr province, Iran. At the 2006 census, its population was 124,291 in 27,199 households. The following census in 2011 counted 128,334 people in 32,236 households. At the latest census in 2016, the district had 145,460 inhabitants living in 40,845 households.

References 

Districts of Bushehr Province
Populated places in Dashtestan County